The Anglican Diocese of Asante Mampong was inaugurated on 23 November 2014, having previously been within the Diocese of Kumasi. The first Diocesan Bishop of Asante Mampong is Cyril Kobina Ben-Smith, formerly suffragan bishop under the authority of the Bishop of Kumasi. The new Diocese covers a remote rural and forest area of the Ashanti region and supports practical ministry in education, health and the provision of clean water as a part of its Christian mission.

Province and Parishes
Asante Mampong is the 17th Diocese within the Church of the Province of West Africa, 11 of which are in the internal Province of Ghana. The mother church of the Diocese is the Cathedral Church of St Michael and All Angels in Mampong and there are currently parishes established at Kumawu (St Peter), Ejura (St Mary's
), Kwamang (St Andrew), Nsuta (St Joseph), Juaben (St Paul), Odumasi (St Peter), Daaho (St John), Kyiremfaso (St Paul), Abonkoso (St Thomas), Konongo (St Barnabas), Bonkro (St Augustine), Jamasi (St Nicholas sub-parish) and Dromankoma (Christ the King). Five more communities are preparing to receive parochial status: Effiduasi (St Mark), Woraso (St Mary), Agogo Anglican Community, Nobewam (St Anthony) and Kofiase/Benim Anglican Community. There is a larger number of small rural stations.

Cathedral
Raised to cathedral status in 2014, the Cathedral Church of St Michael and All Angels, Mampong, is the centre of mission for the Diocese. The Acting Dean is Bismark Opuku Acheampong and Acting Canon Precentor, Balthazar Obeng Larbi who is also Registrar of the Diocese. A significant number of honorary canons have been appointed from other provinces of the Anglican Communion to support the new Diocese with specific skills.

References

Anglican dioceses in Africa
Anglican dioceses in Ghana
Dioceses of the Church of the Province of West Africa
Dioceses in Ghana
2014 establishments in Ghana